Sky Vision was a production and distribution company founded by Sky in 2002 as Parthenon Media Group and was acquired and rebranded by Sky as Sky Vision. The business had investments in nine production businesses in the UK and US: Love Productions, Blast Films!, Sugar Films, True North, Parthenon Entertainment, Chrysalis Vision and Sky Vision Productions in the United Kingdom, and Jupiter Entertainment, Talos Films and Znak & Co. in the United States.

In addition to its investments, the company also worked with independent producers in the UK and US including Asylum Entertainment, Double Nickel Entertainment and Peacock Alley Entertainment in North America, and Avanti Media, Bohemia, Chalkboard, LittleRock Pictures, Merman Films and Spring Films in the United Kingdom.

In April 2019, it was announced that Sky Vision's distribution business would be folded into Comcast's NBCUniversal Global Distribution. On October 1, Sky Vision Distribution officially merged with NBCUniversal Global Distribution. Production assets were transferred to newly founded Sky Studios in the same year.

References

Sky Group
Companies established in 2002
Companies disestablished in 2019
Television production companies of the United Kingdom